Bəhmənli or Bekhmenli or Bekhmanli may refer to:
Bala Bəhmənli, Azerbaijan
Böyük Bəhmənli, Azerbaijan